Matagami Airport  is located  west of Matagami, Quebec, Canada.

See also
 Matagami Water Aerodrome

References

External links

Registered aerodromes in Nord-du-Québec